Puya trollii is a species in the genus Puya. This species is endemic to Bolivia.

References

trollii
Flora of Bolivia